John Albert Goryl (born October 21, 1933) is an American former infielder, manager and coach in Major League Baseball.

Overall, Goryl batted .225 with 134 hits in 276 games over six MLB campaigns.

When his playing career ended, Goryl became a manager in the Twins' farm system (–68; 1970–78), and third-base coach of the MLB Twins (–69; –80). During his second stint as a Minnesota coach in  he was named successor to manager Gene Mauch on August 25. The Twins won 23 of their final 36 games that season, to improve from sixth to third place in the American League West, but when they faltered coming out of the gate in  — losing 25 of their first 36 games — Goryl was replaced by one of his coaches, Billy Gardner. His career MLB managing record was 34–38 (.472).

After his release from the Twins, Goryl joined the Cleveland Indians' organization as a Major League coach (–88; –98) and development official in the Indians' minor league system, continuing into the present day as special adviser/player development. He was inducted in the Kinston Professional Baseball Hall of Fame in 2002. Goryl won the Mike Coolbaugh Award in 2012 for his work ethic, knowledge of the game, and mentoring of young players.

References

External links

1933 births
Living people
American expatriate baseball players in Cuba
Baseball players from Rhode Island
Bluefield Blue-Grays players
Chicago Cubs players
Cienfuegos players
Cleveland Indians coaches
Denver Bears players
Eau Claire Bears players
Eau Claire Braves players
Evansville Braves players
Los Angeles Angels (minor league) players
Major League Baseball infielders
Major League Baseball third base coaches
Memphis Chickasaws players
Minneapolis Millers (baseball) players
Minnesota Twins coaches
Minnesota Twins managers
Minnesota Twins players
Omaha Dodgers players
People from Cumberland, Rhode Island
St. Paul Saints (AA) players
Tulsa Oilers (baseball) players
Wichita Indians players